Marko Maletić (born 25 October 1993) is a Bosnian-Herzegovinian professional footballer who plays as a striker for Serbian club Javor Ivanjica. He holds dual Bosnian and Dutch citizenship, but competes internationally for Bosnia and Herzegovina.

Club career
Maletić made his debut for VfB Stuttgart II on 25 August 2012 in the 3. Liga in a 3–0 victory against SpVgg Unterhaching.

On 2 September 2013, he was loaned out to FC Oss until the end of the season.

On 27 June 2014, Maletić signed a two-year deal with Eredivisie side Excelsior.

In June 2017, he moved to K.S.V. Roeselare.

In January 2019, Maletić joined Paris FC on loan from Roeselare until the end of the season.

In June 2022, Maletić signed with Javor Ivanjica in Serbia.

International career

Maletić played for the Bosnia and Herzegovina under-17 team at the 2010 European Under-17 Championship qualifying round. He scored a goal in this qualifying round on 30 September 2009 against Wales and reached the elite round of the competition. Maletić scored three goals for the Bosnia and Herzegovina under-19 team when he participated in the 2012 European Under-19 Championship qualification and elite round.

At the age of 18 Maletić was called for the first time into the Bosnia and Herzegovina national under-21 team for the last two matches of the 2013 European Under-21 Championship qualification Group 1 in September 2012. He made his debut for the Bosnia and Herzegovina under-21 team on 14 November 2012 against Poland. On 4 June 2013, he scored his first goal for the under-21 national team in friendly match against Serbia.

Personal life
The parents of Marko and his older brother Stefan, who is also a footballer, are originally from Bijeljina in Bosnia and Herzegovina.

References

External links
 
 
 

1993 births
Living people
Footballers from Belgrade
Dutch people of Serbian descent
Bosnia and Herzegovina emigrants to the Netherlands
Association football forwards
Bosnia and Herzegovina footballers
Bosnia and Herzegovina youth international footballers
Bosnia and Herzegovina under-21 international footballers
VfB Stuttgart II players
TOP Oss players
Excelsior Rotterdam players
SC Telstar players
Lommel S.K. players
K.S.V. Roeselare players
FC Dordrecht players
Paris FC players
FC Stade Lausanne Ouchy players
NK Aluminij players
FK Zlatibor Čajetina players
FK Javor Ivanjica players
3. Liga players
Eredivisie players
Eerste Divisie players
Challenger Pro League players
Ligue 2 players
Swiss Challenge League players
Slovenian PrvaLiga players
Serbian SuperLiga players
Bosnia and Herzegovina expatriate footballers
Bosnia and Herzegovina expatriate sportspeople in Germany
Bosnia and Herzegovina expatriate sportspeople in Belgium
Bosnia and Herzegovina expatriate sportspeople in France
Bosnia and Herzegovina expatriate sportspeople in Switzerland
Bosnia and Herzegovina expatriate sportspeople in Slovenia
Bosnia and Herzegovina expatriate sportspeople in Serbia
Expatriate footballers in Germany
Expatriate footballers in Belgium
Expatriate footballers in France
Expatriate footballers in Switzerland
Expatriate footballers in Slovenia
Expatriate footballers in Serbia